The 1949–50 William & Mary Indians men's basketball team represented the College of William & Mary in intercollegiate basketball during the 1949–50 NCAA men's basketball season. Under the third year of head coach Barney Wilson, the team finished the season 23–9 and 12–4 in the Southern Conference. This was the 45th season of the collegiate basketball program at William & Mary, whose nickname is now the Tribe. William & Mary played its home games at Blow Gymnasium.

The Indians finished in a tie for 2nd place in the conference and qualified as the #2 seed for the 1950 Southern Conference men's basketball tournament, hosted by Duke University at the Duke Indoor Stadium in Durham, North Carolina, where the Indians defeated North Carolina in the quarterfinals before losing against Duke in the semifinals.

For the second straight year, William & Mary was invited to participate in the 1950 Cincinnati Invitational Tournament, where the Indians lost their first game against Cincinnati but defeated Morris Harvey in their second.

Program notes
The Indians won their first ever game against a ranked opponent (and first against an AP Top 10 team) when they defeated #8 NC State on February 7, 1950, at Blow Gymnasium.
Senior center Chet Giermak was named to the first team All-Southern Conference for the second straight year. Furthermore, Giermak ended the season with the school record for career points at 2,052 (a record that was not surpassed until 2015, broken by Marcus Thornton). He was also named a second team All-American by Collier's Magazine. Following the season, Giermak was drafted by the Rochester Royals of the NBA. William & Mary would eventually retire his number (#32) and honor him with a banner in William & Mary Hall.
This was the second of three consecutive 20-win seasons for William & Mary, all under head coach Barney Wilson, the only such streak in program history.
The Indians played eight teams for the first time this season: Colby, Pensacola, John Carroll, Akron, Bowling Green, Siena, Cincinnati, and Morris Harvey/Charleston (WV).

Schedule

|-
!colspan=9 style="background:#006400; color:#FFD700;"| Regular season

|-
!colspan=9 style="background:#006400; color:#FFD700;"| 1950 Southern Conference Tournament

|-
!colspan=9 style="background:#006400; color:#FFD700;"| 1950 Cincinnati Invitational Tournament

Source

References

William & Mary Tribe men's basketball seasons
William and Mary Indians
William and Mary Indians Men's Basketball Team
William and Mary Indians Men's Basketball Team